Mary Henry may refer to:

Mary Henry (doctor) (born 1940), Irish doctor and independent Senator
Mary Henry (artist) (1913–2009), American artist
Mary Gibson Henry (1884–1967), American botanist
 Mary Kay Henry (born 1958), American labor union activist
Mary Anna Henry (1834–1903), American diarist